The 1953 Mille Miglia, was the second round of the 1953 F.I.A. World Sportscar Championship and was held on the open-road of Italy, on 26 April 1953. The route was based on a round trip between Brescia and Rome, with start/finish, in Brescia.

A total of 577 cars were entered 1953 running of the Mille Miglia, across eight classes based on engine sizes, ranging from up to 750 cc to over 2.0 litre, for both Touring Cars and Sport Cars. Of these, 490 cars started the event. The smaller displacement, slower cars started first, with each car number related to their allocated start time. For example Juan-Manuel Fangio’s car had the number 602, he left Brescia at 6:02am, while the first cars had started late in the evening on the previous day.

Report

Entry

The works S. P. A. Alfa Romeo entered in force with three new cars, the Alfa Romeo 6C 3000 Competizione Maggiorata to be driven by Fangio, Karl Kling, and Consalvo Sanesi. Scuderia Lancia had assembled a veteran team, consisting of Piero Taruffi, four-time winner Clemente Biondetti, Umberto Maglioli, Felice Bonetto and Franco Bornigia with the first four driving their D20 2900. Ferrari for their part arrived with four 300 bhp 4.1 litre, Ferrari 340 MM Spyder Vignale for Luigi Villoresi, Giuseppe Farina, Giannino Marzotto and the American racer Tom Cole.  For 1953, the Mille Miglia was a round of the new World Sports Car Championship, the home teams faced strong challengers. From Great Britain, came Aston Martin and Jaguar, and France sent Gordini.

Race

The race started at 22:01 on 25 April, when P.J. Darquier departed Brescia in his Renault 4CV/1063. The faster car would leave the following morning, when conditions were warm and dry. After nine and half hours, all the cars were on their way to Rome.
 
The Alfas took the early lead, with Sanesi controlling the pace, averaging 113 mph, on the leg to Verona, but his drive ended with an accident on the road to Rome. The Ferrari of Farina had crashed out, and Kling assumed the lead, only to retire from an accident himself.

Just past Siena, Marzotto remembered that the Ferrari mechanics did not change his engine oil at the last control point, as they were unable to open the bonnet. After making a U-turn, he raced back to Siena, where his mechanics cut a hole in the bonnet, directly over the engines oil filler cap, and topped the oil up accordingly. Meanwhile, Fangio’s Alfa was now leading, but surrender to the chasing Marzotto when his steering started to play up along with fading brakes. When Marzotto got to Bologna, he had broken the 15-year old record for crossing the Futa Pass. Although Marzotto suffered two minor crashes, he took it all the way to Brescia, to win his second Mille Miglia, repeating his success of 1950. In second place with a remarkable drive was Fangio. For most of the return leg, his Alfa had effective steering on one front wheel.

Marzotto, partner by his navigator, Marco Crosara, won in a time of 10hr 37:19mins., averaging a speed of 88.96 mph. 11:44mins adrift in second place was Alfa Romeo 6C 3000 CM of Fangio. The third different car on the podium was the Lancia of Bonetto. Another Ferrari  came home in fourth, driven by Cole. The top Aston Martin was fifth in the hands of Reg Parnell. Apart from Aston Martin’s fifth place, the other foreign challenges faded away. Belgian journalist, Paul Frère won the unlimited touring class in an unlikely 5.3-litre Chrysler Saratoga saloon.

The race had dramatic farce. Film director, Roberto Rossellini drove a Ferrari. Having recently married film star Ingrid Bergman, he raced against her wishes. At Rome, she flung herself across the car and refused to move until he agreed to withdraw.

Typical of the Mille Miglia, the event was marred by fatal accidents. The first was one which cost the French navigator, Pierre-Gilbert Ugnon his life when his driver Luc Descollanges crashed his Jaguar C-Type near Ferrara about 140 miles (224 km) into their race. Descollanges was badly injured and was unconscious for 3 days but managed to make a full recovery. 2 spectators were also killed in the race- 48-year old Auerlio Turci was killed after he was hit by a Porsche 356 being driven by Juan Iturralde and future FIA president Paul Metternich in a suburb of Cesena near Rimini and San Marino 220 miles (352 km) into the route. Several spectators standing with Turci were also injured by the crashing Porsche. And in Ancona, 70 miles further down the Adriatic coast a 12 year old boy was killed after a Fiat 1100 also crashed into a group of spectators.

Classification

Mille Miglia

Of the 490 starters, 283 were classified as finishers. Therefore, only a selection of notably racers has been listed below.

Class Winners are in Bold text.

Class Winners

Standings after the race

Note: Only the top five positions are included in this set of standings.
Championship points were awarded for the first six places in each race in the order of 8-6-4-3-2-1. Manufacturers were only awarded points for their highest finishing car with no points awarded for positions filled by additional cars. Only the best 4 results out of the 7 races could be retained by each manufacturer. Points earned but not counted towards the championship totals are listed within brackets in the above table.

References

Further reading

Anthony Pritchard. The Mille Miglia: The World’s Greatest Road Race. J H Haynes & Co Ltd. 
Leonardo Acerbi. Mille Miglia Story 1927-1957. Giorgio Nada Editore. 

Mille Miglia
Mille Miglia